The H. Milton Stewart School of Industrial and Systems Engineering is a department in the Georgia Institute of Technology's College of Engineering dedicated to education and research in industrial engineering. The school is named after H. Milton Stewart, a local philanthropist and successful businessman who formerly graduated from the BSIE undergraduate program. 

Unlike similar programs at other schools, the School of Industrial and Systems Engineering at Georgia Tech focuses on core disciplines for both Industrial Engineering (such as manufacturing and quality control) and Systems Engineering (such as global logistics and system optimization). U.S. News & World Report consistently ranks the program at number 1.

External links 
 Official website

Georgia Tech colleges and schools
Industrial engineering